Wanmaw, Manmaw or Banmaw (Bhamo) was a Shan state in what is today Burma. It was an outlying territory, located away from the main Shan State area in present-day Kachin State close to the border with China. 

The state existed until 1772. The main town was Man Maw (Bhamo). The name of the state means 'the village of pots (or potters)' in the Shan language.

History 
The early history of the state is obscure. But legends tell of a powerful predecessor Tai state having been established in the area previously which had its capital at the now ruined place of Sampenago. The ruins of the old city walls, dating from the fifth Century, are found some 5 km from the modern town of Bhamo. The ancient capital of Sampenago was renowned for its stupas housing relics of the Buddha.

In 1668 a saopha of Wanmaw named Sao Ngawk Hpa is said to have instigated an attack by the Chinese against the Kingdom of Burma. Wanmaw was subsequently occupied by Burma between 1669 and 1685 and again in mid 18th century. After regaining independence in 1742 it was again occupied by Burma from 1767 to 1770 after a Chinese invasion was repelled. Finally Wanmaw was annexed by the Burmese Ava Kingdom in 1772. The control of this frontier state by the Burmese Kingdom was loose and at the time of the beginning of British rule in Burma the wun in charge of the administration of the territory was de facto quite independent.

Rulers
The rulers of the state bore the title Saopha. Myowuns or wuns were the administrators of the territory of the former state after annexation by Burma.

Saophas

This state existed 1470–1772, when it was incorporated into Burma.

Saophas
 955: Hkun Hkam Hseng       
 1470–1492: Sao Naw Hpa 
 1492–1506: Hso Wad Hpa (b. Hkun Naw Hkam) 
 1506–1517: Hso Hkoen Hpa 
 1517–1534: Naw Jad Hpa 
 1534–1540: Hso Hkam Hpa 
 1540–1549: Hso Hpoek Hpa 
 1549–1574: Ngawk Chew Hpa 
 1574–1601: Awk Htong Lung Sunt 
 1601–1643: U Thit Hpa 
 1643–1685: Sao Ngawk Hpa
 1685–1706: Sao Hpi Hpa
 1706–1719: Sao Mauk Hpa
 1719–1720: Hpo U
 1720–1727: Sao Muak Hpa
 1727–1734: Sao Tung Ngai I (d. 1734)
 1734–1735: Vacant
 1735–1742: Kit Haw
 1742–1770: Sao Tung Ngai II
 1770–1772: Sao Moud Aung (b. 1690 – c. 1772)

Myowuns:
 1772–17??: Mingyi Wailuthaya (U Shwe Ye)
 1853–18??: Mingyi Maha Minhtin Yaza
 1878–18??: U Pho Hla

References

External links
"Gazetteer of Upper Burma and the Shan states"

Shan States
Kachin State